The Tapera River is a river of Paraná state in southern Brazil. It joins the Cavernoso River shortly before that in turn flows into the Iguazu River.

See also
List of rivers of Paraná

References

Rivers of Paraná (state)